Spes Bona is a suburb of Johannesburg, South Africa. It is located in Region F of the City of Johannesburg Metropolitan Municipality.

History
Prior to the discovery of gold on the Witwatersrand in 1886, the suburb lay on land on one of the original farms called Doornfontein. The suburbs name is Latin for good hope and was established in 1896, named after the nearby Spes Bona Goldmine.

References

Johannesburg Region F